The Revenge of the Shadow King is the first volume of three books in the Grey Griffins series written in collaborative writing by American authors Derek Benz and J.S. Lewis, and published by Orchard Books, an imprint of Scholastic Inc. The book follows the story of four friends who form The Order of the Grey Griffin.

Reception 
Paula Brehm-Heeger - VOYA said that the book will find a home in the hearts of teenage readers and those who love Dungeons and Dragons.

References

External links
Official website of the Grey Griffins Books
Orchard Books, an imprint of Scholastic Inc.

2006 American novels
American fantasy novels
Collaborative novels
Orchard Books books